Caroline Atwater Mason (July 10, 1853May 2, 1939) was an American novelist and travel writer.

Life 
Caroline Atwater was born on July 10, 1853, in Providence, Rhode Island, to Mary Weaver and Stephen Atwater. She was educated at the Friends Boarding School in Providence and studied in Germany for one year. On May 29, 1877, she married John H. Mason, a clergyman who taught at Rochester Theological Seminary.

She conducted research at the British Museum Reading Room and the Royal Library of the Netherlands.

Mason opposed suffrage for women and was a member of the National Association Opposed to Woman Suffrage.

She died on May 2, 1939, in Danvers, Massachusetts.

Work 
A Lily of France (1901), described as Mason's "best known story", is a historical novel about Charlotte of Bourbon and William the Silent set largely in a 16th-century convent. A review in the Chicago Tribune described it as a "sweet love story" with themes of religious liberty. Holt of Heathfield (1904) is "a quiet recital of a young minister's life in a factory town".

The Binding of the Strong (1909) is a love story based the romance of a woman of the last name Davis (whose first name is apparently lost to history) and John Milton. The Spell of Italy (1910) is a lightly fictionalized account of travels throughout Italy. The Spell of France (1912) is a similar travel narrative about France.

Publications 

 A Wind Flower
 The Quiet King
A Minister of the World (1895)
A Minister of Carthage (1899)
 A Lily of France (1901)
 Holt of Heathfield (1904)
 The Binding of the Strong (1909)
 The Spell of Italy (1910)
 The Spell of France (1912)
 Royton Manor (1928)
 Challenged (1931)

References 

1853 births
1939 deaths
19th-century American women writers
20th-century American women writers
American travel writers
Writers from Providence, Rhode Island